Iona is a given name that is taken from the Scottish island of Iona, which has a particular significance in the history of Christianity. The derivation of this island name itself is uncertain. The earliest forms of the name enabled place-name scholar William J. Watson to state that it originally meant something like "yew-place".

The modern English name of the island comes from the Irish Ioua, which was either Adomnán's attempt to make the Gaelic name fit Latin grammar or a genuine derivative from Ivova ("yew place"). Ioua eventually became Iona, first attested from c.1274, and results from a transcription mistake resulting from the similarity of "n" and "u" in Insular Minuscule.

Other speculative suggestions have been made for the derivation such as an Old Norse origin from Hiōe meaning "island of the den of the brown bear".

Iona is also the Russian form of the male name Jonah.

Notes

References 
 
 
 
 Watson, W.J. (1926) The History of the Celtic Place-names of Scotland. Reprinted with an introduction by Simon Taylor. Birlinn: Edinburgh, 2004. 

Given names
English feminine given names
Scottish feminine given names